Christopher Hamilton (born 18 May 1995) is an Australian road cyclist, who currently rides for UCI WorldTeam . In 2016 he won the U-23 Australian National Road Race Championships. He was named in the startlist for the 2017 Vuelta a España. In May 2018, he was named in the startlist for the 2018 Giro d'Italia.

Major results

2015
 1st  Criterium, National Under-23 Road Championships
2016
 1st  Road race, National Under-23 Road Championships
 7th Overall Tour de Taiwan
 8th Overall Herald Sun Tour
1st  Young rider classification
2018
 9th Overall Tour of Britain
2019
 6th Overall Tour Down Under
1st  Young rider classification
 8th Overall Tour de Pologne
2022
 9th Overall CRO Race

Grand Tour general classification results timeline

References

External links 

1995 births
Living people
Australian male cyclists
People from Bendigo